Csaba Borszéki (born 15 September 1983 in Budapest) is a retired Hungarian football player who last played for Kecskeméti TE.

References
Player profile at HLSZ 

1983 births
Living people
Footballers from Budapest
Hungarian footballers
Association football goalkeepers
Vác FC players
Vasas SC players
Rákospalotai EAC footballers
Kecskeméti TE players